Büyük Ilyosta Island (literally "Great Ilyosta Island", also called Güneş Island ("Sun Island") is an Aegean island of Turkey. The name of the island is a changed form of the Greek name Eleos.

The sea around the island is a popular diving spot.

References

Aegean islands
Islands of Turkey
Islands of Balıkesir Province